Judge Trimble may refer to:

James Travis Trimble Jr. (born 1932), judge of the United States District Court for the Western District of Louisiana
Robert Trimble (1776–1828), judge of the United States District Court for the District of Kentucky before serving on the Supreme Court of the United States
Thomas Clark Trimble III (1878–1965), judge of the United States District Court for the Eastern District of Arkansas